John Dyson (born 11 June 1954) is a former international cricketer (batsman) who is now a cricket coach, most recently in charge of the West Indies.

He played 30 Test matches and 29 One Day Internationals for Australia between 1977 and 1984. He did not enjoy as much success at the international level as he did at the first class level. In first-class matches, he scored nearly 10,000 runs at an average of 40. Dyson is probably best remembered for his "catch of the century" at the Sydney Cricket Ground in 1982, when he caught Sylvester Clarke in the outfield, over his head, at a 45-degree angle to the ground, running backwards.

Dyson participated in two "rebel tours" of South Africa in 1985-86 and 1986–87 in defiance of the international sporting boycott of the apartheid state, scoring over 1,000 runs. He played soccer as a goalkeeper in the Sutherland Shire (Cronulla RSL) and was a member of the side that won the Dallimore Competition and runners-up in the NSW Amateur Cup final. He was a team member of the Como West Junior Soccer Club (Sutherland Shire) successful 18A, 1971 Champion of Champion team, progressed to play in Sutherland and St. George Grade and was also selected in the N.S.W. U20 squad.

On 21 October 2007 he was named as coach of the West Indies having previously coached Sri Lanka from 2003 to 2005. On 20 March 2009 he incorrectly called the West Indies in because of bad light after 46.2 overs over of an ODI against England. His decision to do so was based on a faulty D/L calculation because of a fall of wicket on the second ball of the 47th over, thereby causing his team to lose a match it had a good chance of winning.

He was sacked as the coach of the West Indies on 13 August 2009 shortly before the team was due to play in the ICC Champions Trophy in South Africa.

Early career

1975-76: First-class debut
Dyson was made NSW 12th man for a game against the touring West Indies. He then scored 159 for NSW Colts against Victorian Colts.

He was picked to play for NSW against Qld. He played three first class games with a high score of 28 and was dropped that summer for Graeme Hughes.

1976-77
Dyson made a century against Tasmania for NSW. He scored 342 runs at 42.75.

Test debut

1977-78: Test debut
The loss of many senior Australian players to World Series Cricket saw spots open up in the Australian test team. In particular there was a lack of openers.

Dyson attracted attention with a man of the match innings against Queensland in a Gillette Cup semi final. He followed it with innings of 102 off 366 balls for NSW against WA. He then made 65 against the touring Indians and 103 against Victoria.

Australia opened with Gary Cosier and Paul Hibbert in the first test. Hibbert was dropped for the second, replaced by John Dyson.

Dyson made 53 runs in the first innings, taking part in a crucial partnership of 84 with Bob Simpson. He made 4 in the second but those first innings runs proved especially valuable in a narrow Australian victory. He was kept in the side for the next two tests.

However, in those tests, both lost by Australia, Dyson scored 0 and 12 and 26 and 6. He was dropped from the side and was not picked on the subsequent tour of the West Indies.

That summer he became the first known Sydney player to wear a helmet playing grade cricket. He scored 607 runs at an average of 25.

Dyson spent the 1978 Australian winter playing for Haslingden in the Lancashire League.

1978-79
Dyson was unable to force his way back into the test team during the 1978-79 summer. He was dropped from the state side early on for a Gillette Cup game but bounced back to make 57 in a districts game.

Dyson was back in the state side replacing Ron Crippin. He scored an impressive 67 against the touring English.

He went on to score 619 runs at 44.21 including a top score of 197 against Tasmania. However Australian selectors preferred Andrew Hilditch.

1979-80
Dyson scored 55 in a state trial game but was overlooked by NSW in favor of Trevor Chappell. This was controversial because it was felt the selectors had bias towards World Series players. However Dyson soon forced his way back into the side and had a reasonably successful season scoring 729 runs at 42. He was rewarded in selection for the Australian squad to tour England in 1980. He played three first class games with a top score of 33 and was overlooked for the Centenary Test.

Return to Test side

1980-81
Dyson had an excellent 1980-81 summer domestically including a record first wicket partnership with Rick McCosker against WA. He was picked in the ODI side and scored 69 and 79 against New Zealand.

He returned to the test side in 1980-81 scoring 30 and 24 not out against New Zealand. In the following tests he made 28 and 25 and 13 and 16.

Dyson kept his spot for the following test series against India. He made 0, 30 and 28 and 16 and 3.

Dyson scored 1028 first class runs that summer at 57.11. He was second in the highest Sheffield Shield run scorers in that season - only Greg Chappell amassed more.

In February 1981 Ian Chappell left out Dyson from Chappell's hypothetical test squad to England "because he seems to have a mental barrier about making big scores in test cricket."

1981 Ashes
Despite his relative lack of success at test level, Dyson's excellent first class form saw him picked in the Australian squad to tour England in 1981.

In the first test he scored 5 and 38 then made 7 and 1.

In the third test he scored 102 in the first innings and 34 in the second but the match is best remembered for being a famous Australian defeat.

Dyson made 1 and 13 in the fourth test and 0 and 5 for the fifth. He was dropped for the last game and replaced by NSW teammate Dirk Wellham.

1981-82: Third stint in Test side
Dyson missed the three tests against Pakistan. However he scored 98 and 123 for NSW against the West Indian touring side and earned a recall for the second test against the West Indies, scoring 28, a match saving 127 not out and taking his famous "catch of the century" In the third test he made 1 and 10.

He made 709 first class runs that season at 54.53.

He scored 101 in a McDonald's Cup semi final.

Dyson kept his spot for the tour of New Zealand. He made 12, 33 and 1 and 14.

1982-83: Pakistan and England
Dyson toured Pakistan in 1982, playing all three tests. He started well scoring 87 and 6 then made 23 and 43 and 10 and 51.

Dyson played all five tests at home during the 1982-83 Ashes. He had scores of 52 and 12, 1 and 4, 44 and 37, 21 and 31 and 79 and 2.

Dyson made 43 & 59 for New South Wales against an England XI at the SCG and 44 in a 50 over match against New Zealand.

He was dropped from the Australia side in the World Series Cup despite averaging almost 40 in the first 9 matches.

Dyson scored 52 against the touring Sri Lanka team for New South Wales at the SCG.

Dyson was not selected for the Australian squad that toured Sri Lanka. Subsequently, he was not included for the 1983 World Cup in England.

1983-84: Prolific season for NSW
Dyson was overlooked the following summer for the series against Pakistan in favour of Wayne Phillips. He went on to score 1015 runs in the Sheffield Shield at 63.43, including a career best score of 241. He shared the competition's Player of the Year award with Brian Davison of Tasmania. Despite this outstanding season, he didn't earn a place on the Australian tours of the West Indies and India, with his fellow New South Welshman Steve Smith preferred. However, the highlight of this year was the birth of first child, Alexis.

1984-85: Final stint in Test side and domestic success
Tremendous domestic form saw Dyson earn a recall to the test team in November 1984 to play the West Indies. In his last three tests he made 0 and 30, 13 and 21 and 8 and 5. Dyson did score 98 and 16 for NSW against the West Indies in a tour match prior to the second test. He was dropped for Andrew Hilditch in the fourth test and never regained his spot.

Dyson scored 79 in the McDonald's Cup final for NSW in an 88 run win over South Australia and 66 in NSW first innings of the Sheffield Shield final victory against Queensland at the SCG.

He scored 897 runs at 40.77.

Dyson hit 105 in the Tooheys Cup in which locals mixed with elite NSW players.

Rebel tours and return to NSW

1985-87: Rebel tours to South Africa
During their successful Sheffield Shield campaign of 1984/85 for NSW teammate Imran Khan said that he hoped Dyson would be selected for the Ashes tour to England in the summer of 1985. However it emerged that Dyson had agreed to participate in an Australian rebel tour to South Africa. Dyson enjoyed two productive trips to South Africa. He scored 577 runs in 1985–86 at 44.38 then made 522 runs at 52.2 the following summer. He was banned from playing in Australia for two years and three years from the international team along with the other rebels.

1988-89: Later career
Dyson expressed a desire to regain a place in the test side when his ban was over but he struggled on his return to NSW in January 1988 making 157 runs at 19.62 from 5 games during the 1987/88 season with a highest score of 60 not out. For most of the matches he would open the batting with Mark Taylor.

The following summer was more successful, scoring 742 runs at 39.05 including 79 and 100 not out for NSW against the touring West Indians and 34 for NSW against Pakistan. He scored 112 not out against Tasmania in the Sheffield Shield at the SCG which was his nineteenth and final first-class century. Dyson's good form led to speculation he could earn a place on the tour to England for the 1989 Ashes series however he was not selected.

Dyson captained NSW for two FAI cup games at the start of the 1989–90 season but suffered a knee injury and was replaced in the side by Steve Small for the first Sheffield Shield match against South Australia in Adelaide. The selectors then preferred promising prospect Geoff Milliken and Dyson never regained his state place. He had amassed 9935 first class runs at an average of 40.

1989-98

Dyson continued to play first grade cricket for Sutherland and was captain of the side which included a young Glenn McGrath.

In 1991, NSW captain Geoff Lawson attempted to persuade the selectors to recall Dyson but they decided against it.

He continued to play grade cricket until 1994.

Dyson was NSW's Assistant Coach to Lawson from 1995 to 1997.

He represented Australia in two masters tournaments (1995 and 1998).

References

External links
 

1954 births
Living people
Australia One Day International cricketers
Australia Test cricketers
New South Wales cricketers
Australian cricket coaches
Coaches of the Sri Lanka national cricket team
West Indies cricket team selectors
Australian cricketers
Coaches of the West Indies cricket team
Cricketers from Sydney
Sportsmen from New South Wales
Australian expatriate sportspeople in Sri Lanka